Seneca is an unincorporated community in the town of Seneca, Crawford County, Wisconsin, United States. Seneca has a post office with ZIP code 54654. Seneca Area School District and Seneca High School is located in the community.

References

Unincorporated communities in Crawford County, Wisconsin
Unincorporated communities in Wisconsin